The 2015 Albany Great Danes football team represented the University at Albany, SUNY in the 2015 NCAA Division I FCS football season. They were led by Greg Gattuso, who was in his second season as head coach, and played their home games  Bob Ford Field at Tom & Mary Casey Stadium. The Great Danes were in their third season as members of the Colonial Athletic Association. They finished the season 3–8, 2–6 in CAA play to finish in 11th place.

Schedule

Source: Schedule

References

Albany
Albany Great Danes football seasons
Albany Great Danes football